Circle is a studio album by jazz pianist George Cables, recorded in 1979 but not released until 1985 by Contemporary Records.

Reception
The Allmusic review by  Ken Dryden stated "This LP is primarily a showcase for Cables' compositions ... The only disappointing track is "Thank You, Thank You," with the leader switching to electric piano and clavinet for a brisk but rather dated-sounding funk piece that leans toward what would eventually be called smooth jazz. But one dud is hardly a reason to avoid making a search for this rewarding LP".

Track listing
All compositions by George Cables except where noted.
 "I Remember Clifford" (Benny Golson) – 6:18
 "Beyond Forever" – 7:09
 "Thank You, Thank You" – 4:52
 "The Phantom" – 8:45
 "Circle" – 6:14
 "Love Song" – 7:05

Personnel
George Cables - piano, electric piano, clavinet
Joe Farrell – flute (tracks 2 & 4) 
Tony Dumas (track 3), Rufus Reid (tracks 1, 2 & 4-6) - bass
Peter Erskine (track 3), Eddie Gladden (tracks 1, 2 & 4-6) - drums

References

George Cables albums
1985 albums
Contemporary Records albums